The 1988–89 season of the European Cup Winners' Cup was won for the third time by Barcelona in the final against Italian entrants Sampdoria. The two sides would meet again in the 1992 European Cup Final, which Barcelona also won. Wimbledon did not participate due to UEFA's five-year ban on English clubs from European competition. The defending champions Mechelen were eliminated in the semi-finals by eventual runners-up Sampdoria.

Preliminary round 

|}

First leg

Second leg

Békéscsabai won 4–2 on aggregate.

First round 

|}

First leg

Second leg

Mechelen won 8–1 on aggregate.

Eintracht Frankfurt won 1–0 on aggregate.

Cardiff City won 4–0 on aggregate.

AGF won 7–2 on aggregate.

Barcelona won 7–0 on aggregate.

Lech Poznań won 4–2 on aggregate.

Sredets Sofia won 8–2 on aggregate.

Panathinaikos won 3–0 on aggregate.

Roda JC won 2–1 on aggregate.

Metalist Kharkiv won 4–2 on aggregate.

Sakaryaspor won 2–1 on aggregate.

Anderlecht won 5–1 on aggregate.

Dundee United won 1–0 on aggregate.

Dinamo București won 6–0 on aggregate.

Carl Zeiss Jena won 5–1 on aggregate.

Sampdoria won 3–2 on aggregate.

Second round 

|}

First leg

Second leg

AGF won 6–1 on aggregate.

2–2 on aggregate; Barcelona won 5–4 on penalties.

Sredets Sofia won 3–0 on aggregate.

Roda JC won 1–0 on aggregate.

Eintracht Frankfurt won 6–1 on aggregate.

Mechelen won 3–0 on aggregate.

Dinamo București won 2–1 on aggregate.

Sampdoria won 4–2 on aggregate.

Quarter-finals 

|}

First leg

Second leg

Barcelona won 1–0 on aggregate.

3–3 on aggregate; Sredets Sofia won 4–3 on penalties.

Mechelen won 1–0 on aggregate.

1–1 on aggregate; Sampdoria won on away goals.

Semi-finals 

|}

First leg

Second leg

Barcelona won 6–3 on aggregate.

Sampdoria won 4–2 on aggregate.

Final

Top scorers

See also
 1988–89 European Cup
 1988–89 UEFA Cup

External links 
 1988-89 competition at UEFA website
 Cup Winners' Cup results at Rec.Sport.Soccer Statistics Foundation
 Cup Winners Cup Seasons 1988-89 – results, protocols

3
UEFA Cup Winners' Cup seasons